Labeobarbus mbami is a species of cyprinid fish endemic to the Sanaga River basin in Cameroon.

References 

mbami
Fish described in 1927
Cyprinid fish of Africa
Endemic fauna of Cameroon